Garden State Youth Correctional Facility is a New Jersey Department of Corrections state prison that houses young adult offenders ages 18-30, located in the Crosswicks section of Chesterfield Township in Burlington County, New Jersey, United States.  The facility opened in 1968 and has a maximum capacity of 1511 inmates.

References

1968 establishments in New Jersey
Chesterfield Township, New Jersey
Prisons in New Jersey
Buildings and structures in Burlington County, New Jersey